In mathematics, the Plancherel theorem (sometimes called the Parseval–Plancherel identity) is a result in harmonic analysis, proven by Michel Plancherel in 1910. It states that the integral of a function's squared modulus is equal to the integral of the squared modulus of its frequency spectrum.

This implies that the Fourier transform map restricted to   has a unique extension to  a linear isometric map , sometimes called the Plancherel transform. This isometry is actually a unitary map. In effect, this makes it possible to speak of Fourier transforms of quadratically integrable functions.

Plancherel's theorem remains valid as stated on n-dimensional Euclidean space . The theorem also holds more generally in locally compact abelian groups. There is also a version of the Plancherel theorem which makes sense for non-commutative locally compact groups satisfying certain technical assumptions.  This is the subject of non-commutative harmonic analysis.

The unitarity of the Fourier transform is often called Parseval's theorem in science and engineering fields, based on an earlier (but less general) result that was used to prove the unitarity of the Fourier series.

Due to the polarization identity, one can also apply Plancherel's theorem to the  inner product of two functions.

and 

so

See also
Plancherel theorem for spherical functions

References 

 .
 .
 .

External links
 
 Plancherel's Theorem on Mathworld

Theorems in functional analysis
Theorems in harmonic analysis
Theorems in Fourier analysis
Lp spaces